The Individual Speedway Junior Swedish Championship is an annual speedway event held each year since 1958. Swedish riders aged 21 and under take part.

Previous winners

See also
History of motorcycle speedway in Sweden

References

Sweden U21
Speedway competitions in Sweden